Célena Francine Alexandra Cherry (born 26 April 1977) is an English singer and songwriter. She is the lead singer of the girl group Honeyz.

Early life and career
Cherry attended Corona Theatre School in Kew, London. Her parents are from Grenada and St Lucia. Before forming Honeyz, she was in another girl group called Illusion.

Honeyz
Honeyz formed in 1997 until being dropped in 2001 and split a year later, the group reformed throughout 2005–06 for one-off appearances. In May 2012 it was announced that the group would officially reform for the ITV2 series The Big Reunion, which started airing from 31 January 2013. Due to the success of the show, Honeyz went on an arena tour in May 2013.

Solo career
After the failure of the second Honeyz album, Cherry teamed up with her cousin Alani (former Kleshay singer) under the name Anotherside. They released one single together, "This Is Your Night", through V2 Records.

In 2005, Cherry released her first solo album, Celena Cherry, through her official website. This exclusive limited edition CD featured new interpretations of some of her Honeyz hits, plus some new material and personal favourites along with a selection of festive songs.

Cherry has also pursued an acting career, appearing in the soap operas Hollyoaks and Doctors. In an interview with Just Celebrity Magazine, she said she would love to get back into acting. Celena also attended the launch of a new stage school in Harpenden on Friday 13 September 2013 (part of Top Hat Stage & Screen School).

According to Cherry's official website, Honeyz are currently recording a new album as a group. She is at the same time working on her second solo album. Three songs, "Gave You My Love", "Tell Me Why" and "Conscience Calling", are on her Myspace page.

Personal life
Cherry has two children, Sienna and Michael and was married to Danny Oliver, who is a Michael Jackson tribute artist. In 2018, Cherry and Oliver auditioned for the twelfth series of Britain's Got Talent; their audition was shown on spin-off show Britain's Got More Talent. Judge Alesha Dixon, who was a member of fellow girl group Mis-Teeq, recognised her. When asked by Simon Cowell to tell the judges about themselves, Cherry said "I used to be in a girl group called the Honeyz", implying that the band were over.

Discography

Albums

Singles

References

External links

English women singers
British contemporary R&B singers
21st-century Black British women singers
Honeyz members
1977 births
Living people
People from Hammersmith
English people of Kenyan descent